Molly Bartrip (born 1 June 1996) is an English professional footballer who plays as a defender for Women's Super League club Tottenham Hotspur.

Early life
Molly Bartrip started her playing career at age seven with Tottenham's U10s team, in the mid-2000s. She was initially scouted while playing on a local boys team. At age 11 she went on to play for Charlton Athletic and a few years after that she joined Arsenal.

Club career

Reading 
Bartrip joined Reading on 4 April 2014 from Arsenal's academy, ahead of the club's debut season in the newly created FA Women's Super League 2. She played four matches in the 2014 WSL Cup for Reading but no  league appearances. In December 2015 Bartrip signed a professional contract with Reading ahead of the club's debut in the WSL.

Her WSL debut came in the season opener on 23 March 2016 in a start against her former club Arsenal. She scored her first and only goal for the club on 1 November 2017 in a win against Watford in the group stage of the 2017–18 FA WSL Cup. Bartrip made her 100th appearance across all competitions for Reading on 10 February 2021 in a win away to Manchester United. She left the club after the 2020–21 FA WSL season, along with seven other players.

Tottenham Hotspur 
On 16 July 2021 she joined Tottenham Hotspur from Reading for an undisclosed fee, signing a two-year contract. She played her first game for Spurs in a 1–0 league win over Birmingham City.

Personal life 
In 2018, Bartrip revealed that she had anorexia nervosa during her teenage years.

Career statistics

Club

References

External links
 
 Reading player profile 
 

Living people
1996 births
English women's footballers
Women's association football defenders
Women's Super League players
Reading F.C. Women players
Tottenham Hotspur F.C. Women players
England women's under-23 international footballers